The Crown Point Bridge is a covered bridge in the city of Crown Point in the U.S. state of Indiana. Originally built over the Little Flatrock River, two miles south of Milroy, Rush County, Indiana (Section 24, Township 12 North, and Range 9 East), the Milroy or Shelbourne Covered Bridge was built by Archibald M. Kennedy & Sons in 1878. Highway improvements in 1933 displaced the bridge, and it was moved to Crown Point, Indiana. John Wheeler led the preservation effort, having the structure dismantled, moved, and erected in the Lake County Fairgrounds over a gully.

The bridge is a single-span Burr Arch Truss. It has an 

References

Covered bridges in Indiana
Transportation buildings and structures in Lake County, Indiana
Bridges in Rush County, Indiana
Tourist attractions in Lake County, Indiana
Road bridges in Indiana
Relocated buildings and structures in Indiana
Wooden bridges in Indiana
Burr Truss bridges in the United States
1878 establishments in Indiana